Some Good News is a 2020 American web series created and hosted by American actor and filmmaker John Krasinski on YouTube, which premiered on March 29, 2020. Krasinski self-funded and co-produced the show with his production company, Sunday Night Productions, and filmed each episode remotely from his home in Brooklyn during the COVID-19 pandemic. After eight episodes and a live-streamed prom, a report from the Hollywood Reporter announced that the show was sold to ViacomCBS on May 22, 2020. Krasinski later confirmed that he dropped plans for any adaptations to the show and that it would be kept in its original format. Krasinski brought the show back for a holiday special on YouTube in December 2020.

Since the first season concluded, Some Good News has raised over $2 million for various charities through their Some Good Merch Sevenly store. Donations have gone to Direct Relief, Boys & Girls Clubs of America, Trauma Free World, World Central Kitchen, the NAACP Legal Defense and Education Fund, Toys For Tots, and the Restaurant Employee Relief Fund.

Premise
The show, which was originally developed and hosted on YouTube, is "a news show dedicated entirely to good news," with Krasinski operating inside his home during the COVID-19 pandemic. In each episode, he discusses several feel-good stories and invites celebrity guests to join in conversation.

Cast

Host
 John Krasinski

Guests

Production

Development
Krasinski conceptualized Some Good News in 2013, but launched the series in 2020, amid the imposed lockdown during the COVID-19 pandemic. He self-financed and produced the program, in conjunction with his production banner partner, Allyson Seeger. Various companies were hired for production, editing, marketing, and other aspects.

On May 21, 2020, ViacomCBS announced that it had acquired Some Good News, following a bidding war, with the intention of turning the show into a weekly addition to traditional news segments for CBS All Access and Comedy Central with productions through Comedy Central Productions. Krasinski stated he would step down as host, but remain an executive producer alongside Sunday Night Productions. However, in May 2021, Krasinski announced he and ViacomCBS did not move forward with development plans for the company's streaming platform. Instead, Some Good News would remain in its original format on YouTube as well as secondary video platforms established in the show's original run such as Snapchat.

Episodes

Live virtual prom special
On April 16, 2020, Krasinski announced that he was DJing a live-streamed prom special on the channel the following night at 8:00 pm EDT. The Jonas Brothers performed their song "Sucker" while Eilish and O'Connell performed "Bad Guy". Krasinski stated, "We are all going through this together. It's a very weird time, but each and every one of you are missing something and this is the least I could do and I couldn't be more proud to do it." Mashable called the episode "truly a night to remember." Vulture stated "Overall, [it was] at least as fun as our actual physical prom, minus the $$$. Hope you enjoyed, Class of 2020!"

Around 86,500 people were watching initially, but there were over 214,000 viewers by the end.

Reception

Audience viewership
Some Good News debuted on YouTube on March 29, 2020, and accumulated 330,000 subscribers overnight. The first episode appeared on YouTube's Trending page and was viewed 3.1 million times one day after being uploaded. It had been viewed over 12 million times by April 5, 2020.

Within the first eight weeks, the eight episode series drew in over 72 million views and 2.58 million subscribers.

Critical response
Some Good News was positively received, including the accompanying Twitter account Krasinski set up for the show under the handle @somegoodnews. TV Insider wrote "... Some Good News has proven how powerful spreading positivity can be. TV fans should put their faith in John Krasinski to deliver what the title of his YouTube series promises amidst the chaos and hardships of life during the COVID-19 pandemic."

Reviewing the second episode, CBN News stated, "just like the first episode, this one is definitely worth watching." NPR stated the episode was an "explosion of good-hearted joy". Michelle Obama shared the video on social media, adding, "I couldn't help but smile after watching this video with John Krasinski, Lin-Manuel Miranda, and the cast of Hamilton surprising a young fan, giving us all a little bit of joy at this difficult time." Jimmy Traina of Sports Illustrated said the third episode "managed to create some damn good sports content—and some tears."

Accolades
Some Good News won a Special Achievement Award at the 2020 Webby Awards and was nominated for a Streamy Award.

Some Good Merch
In episode eight, John Krasinski announced that Some Good News had partnered with Sevenly and the Starbucks Foundation to launch Some Good Merch, an online merchandise store where 100% of profits go to charity. As of 2021, over two million dollars have been donated to six charities through Some Good Merch. Donations from Some Good Merch to Direct Relief specifically provided emergency aid to the Navajo Nation and White River Indian Hospital in Fort Apache Indian Reservation, a facility serving over 17,000 tribal members and run by the Indian Health Service (IHS). The donation included COVID-19 PPE, thousands of masks and sanitizer, and other relief supplies compiled by a coordinating team at First Nations Fund. Additionally, PPE donations were made to SelfHelp Community Services, a home and community-based healthcare service for elderly Holocaust survivors and homebound seniors. With Trauma Free World, Some Good Merch donations went towards the international "Signs for Hope" program, which assists in the training of trauma-informed care for deaf children and orphans. Additionally, donations to the Boys & Girls Clubs of America assisted in the remote re-opening of the Metro Atlanta BGCA after the club was forced to close due to the COVID-19 Pandemic. Donations have also been made to the World Central Kitchen, Toys for Tots, NAACP Legal Defense and Education Fund, and the Restaurant Employee Relief Fund.

References

External links
 
 

2020 web series debuts
2020 web series endings
2020s American television talk shows
2020s YouTube series
American non-fiction web series
English-language television shows
Television shows about the COVID-19 pandemic
Works by John Krasinski
2020s American television news shows
Webby Award winners